Örjan Martinsson (1 November 1936 – 28 February 1997) was a Swedish footballer. He played in 20 matches for the Sweden national football team from 1960 to 1966.

Honours
IFK Norrköping
 Allsvenskan: 1960, 1962, 1963

References

External links
 

1936 births
1997 deaths
Swedish footballers
Sweden international footballers
Association footballers not categorized by position